Redmire is a village and civil parish in the Richmondshire district of North Yorkshire, England.

Transport

Redmire is the terminus of the Wensleydale Railway. The Ministry of Defence uses trains to transport armoured vehicles from bases in the south to the Catterick military area using Redmire railway station as its terminus.

Popular culture
The village was featured in the BBC television series All Creatures Great and Small, in the episode "Puppy Love", as the location of Darrowby bus stop. The village pub, the Bolton Arms, was also featured in the episode "Beauty of the Beast".

See also
St Mary's Church, Redmire

References

External links

Villages in North Yorkshire
Civil parishes in North Yorkshire
Wensleydale